Tillie may refer to:


Places in the United States
 Tillie, Kentucky, an unincorporated community
 Tillie, Pennsylvania, a former populated place
 Tillie Creek, California

People
 Tillie (name), a given name and surname

Animal
 Tillie (elephant), elephant in the John Robinson Circus

Other uses
 Tropical Storm Tillie, in the 1964 Pacific hurricane season
 Tillie (murals), two murals (or one mural with two sides) in New Jersey
 Tillie the All-Time Teller, an ATM run by the First National Bank of Atlanta
 Tillie (film), a 1922 film directed by Frank Urson

See also
 Tilly (disambiguation)
 Tilley (disambiguation)